Janardan Gyanoba Navle  (pronounced Nuw-lay) (7 December 1902 – 7 September 1979) was an early Indian Test cricketer.

Career
Navle faced the historic first delivery of India's first Test innings in 1932. He opened in both innings at Lord's in 1932 and also kept wickets. A small man, Wisden called him "a first-rate wicket-keeper, very quick in all that he did". He played for Indians against Arthur Gilligan's MCC team in 1926–27 and Jack Ryder's Australians nine years later. For many years he kept wickets for Hindus in the Bombay Quadrangular and Pentangular tournaments. He made his debut for Hindus at the age of 16.

Personal life
In his later life he worked as a security guard in a sugar mill and lived in a two-room flat in Pune. He had his schooling at the Bhave School in Poona. He died in Poona on 7 September 1979.

References

External links
 

Indian cricketers
India Test cricketers
Hindus cricketers
Central India cricketers
Holkar cricketers
Gwalior cricketers
1902 births
1979 deaths
Cricketers from Maharashtra
Wicket-keepers
Roshanara Club cricketers